John Meinert Printing (Pty) Ltd was a publishing house in Namibia, named after its founder John Meinert, businessman and former mayor of Windhoek. It owned the country's only large printing works. In 1991 the business was sold to Namibia Media Holdings.

The publishing house was founded as Windhuker Druckerei in German South West Africa. John Meinert entered as managing director in 1913 and bought the business in 1917. John Meinert Printing owned the publishing house Deutscher Verlag, the publisher of the German-language daily Allgemeine Zeitung. Later, the weekly Windhoek Advertiser was launched. It also ran Namibia's only large printing works. All major Namibian newspapers were printed at John Meinert.

In 1991 the company was incorporated into Democratic Media Holdings (today Namibia Media Holdings) which founded its own printing works, Newsprint Namibia, one year later. The rights to the name were sold in 1999; The  John Meinert Printing company in Windhoek is otherwise unrelated to the entity that owned Namibia's printing works.

References

Mass media in Namibia
Companies based in Windhoek
1917 establishments in South West Africa
1991 disestablishments in Namibia
Publishing companies established in 1917
Publishing companies disestablished in 1991